The 1932 PGA Championship was the 15th PGA Championship, held August 30 to September 4 at Keller Golf Course in Maplewood, Minnesota, a suburb north of Saint Paul. Then a match play championship, Olin Dutra won the first of his two major titles, defeating Frank Walsh 4 & 3. Dutra was also the medalist in the 36-hole stroke play qualifier on 

Defending champion Tom Creavy lost in the semifinals to Walsh in 38 holes. Two-time champion Gene Sarazen opted to participate in sectional qualifying, but did not advance; he returned the following year and won a third 

Keller Golf Course, a municipal facility owned and operated by Ramsey County, hosted the PGA Championship again in 1954.

Format
The match play format at the PGA Championship in 1932 called for 12 rounds (216 holes) in six days:
 Tuesday – 36-hole stroke play qualifier
defending champion Tom Creavy and top 31 professionals advanced to match play
 Wednesday – first round – 36 holes 
 Thursday – second round – 36 holes 
 Friday – quarterfinals – 36 holes 
 Saturday – semifinals – 36 holes 
 Sunday – final – 36 holes

Past champions in the field

Failed to qualify

Armour did not advance in the eight-way playoff for the final two spots in the match play field.
Gene Sarazen (1922, 1923) opted to participate in sectional qualifying, but did not advance.
Source:

Final results
Sunday, September 4, 1932

Final eight bracket

Final match scorecards
Morning

Afternoon

Source:

References

External links
PGA Media Guide 2012
PGA.com – 1932 PGA Championship 
Keller Golf Course

PGA Championship
Golf in Minnesota
Sports in Minneapolis–Saint Paul
PGA Championship
PGA Championship
PGA Championship
PGA Championship
PGA Championship